Highway 780 is a provincial highway in the Canadian province of Saskatchewan. It runs from Highway 2 to Highway 55. Highway 780 is about 19 km (12 mi.) long.

3 km from Highway 2, Highway 780 passes through the town of White Star.

See also 
Roads in Saskatchewan
Transportation in Saskatchewan

References 

780